A temporary satellite is an object which has been captured by the gravitational field of a planet and thus has become the planet's natural satellite, but, unlike irregular moons of the larger outer planets of the Solar System, will eventually either leave its orbit around the planet or collide with the planet. Some defunct space probes or rockets have also been observed on temporary satellite orbits.

In astrophysics, a temporary satellite is any body that enters the Hill sphere of a planet at a sufficiently low velocity such that it becomes gravitationally bound to the planet for some period of time.

Capture of asteroids 

The dynamics of the capture of asteroids by Earth was explored in simulations conducted on a supercomputer, with results published in 2012. Of 10 million virtual near-Earth asteroids, 18,000 have been temporarily captured.

According to the simulations, temporary satellites are typically caught and released when they pass one of two gravitational equilibrium points of the Sun and the planet along the line connecting the two, the L1 and L2 Lagrangian points. The captured asteroids typically have orbits very similar to the planet's (co-orbital configuration) and are captured most often when the planet is closest to the Sun (in the case of the Earth, in January) or furthest from the Sun (Earth: in July).

In strict sense, only bodies that complete a full orbit around a planet are considered temporary satellites, also called temporarily captured orbiters (TCO). However, asteroids not in a tight co-orbital configuration with a planet can be temporarily captured for less than a full orbit; such objects have been named temporarily-captured fly-bys (TCF). In a 2017 follow-up to the 2012 simulation study which also considered an improved model of near-Earth asteroid populations, 40% of captured objects were TCF. In another 2017 study based on simulations with one million virtual co-orbital asteroids, 0.36% have been temporarily captured.

Examples 

, two objects have been observed at the time when they were temporary satellites:  and 2020 CD3. According to orbital calculations, on its solar orbit,  passes Earth at low speed every 20 to 21 years, at which point it can become a temporary satellite again.

, there is one confirmed example of a temporarily captured asteroid that didn't complete a full orbit, . This asteroid was observed for a month after its discovery in November 1991, then again in April 1992, after which it wasn't seen until May 2017. After the recovery, orbital calculations confirmed that  was a temporary satellite of Earth in February 1992.
Another temporary capture episode was experienced by  that may return as a mini-moon in December 2051.

Artificial objects on temporary satellite orbits 

The Earth can also temporarily capture defunct space probes or rockets travelling on solar orbits, in which case astronomers cannot always immediately determine whether the object is artificial or natural.

The artificial origin has been confirmed in other cases. In September 2002, astronomers found an object designated J002E3. The object was on a temporary satellite orbit around Earth, leaving for a solar orbit in June 2003. Calculations showed that it was also on a solar orbit before 2002, but was close to Earth in 1971. J002E3 was identified as the third stage of the Saturn V rocket that carried Apollo 12 to the Moon. In 2006, an object designated 6Q0B44E was discovered on a temporary satellite orbit, later its artificial nature was confirmed, but its identity is unknown.

See also

 Near-Earth object
 Horseshoe orbit
 Quasi-satellite
 EQUULEUS

References

Moons